This is a list of public art in the Metropolitan Borough of Dudley, in the West Midlands, England. This list applies only to works of public art accessible in an outdoor public space. For example, this does not include artwork visible inside a museum.

Dudley

Duncan Edwards Way

Castle Gate Island

Wolverton Road

Flood Street Island

Cinder Bank Island

Scotts Green Island

Town Centre

Priory Park

Black Country Living Museum

Dudley Zoo

Brierley Hill

Stourbridge

Stourbridge Town Centre

Mary Stevens Park

Stourbridge Interchange

Stourbridge Junction

Lye

Oldswinford

References 

Dudley
Dudley